The year 2016 is the 24th year in the history of the K-1. 2016 starts with K-1 World GP 2016 -65kg Japan Tournament.

List of events

K-1 World GP 2016 -65kg Japan Tournament

K-1 World GP 2016 -65kg Japan Tournament was a kickboxing event held on March 4, 2016 at the Yoyogi National Gymnasium in Tokyo, Japan.

Results

K-1 World GP 2016 -65kg Japan Tournament bracket

K-1 World GP 2016 -60kg Japan Tournament

K-1 World GP 2016 -60kg Japan Tournament was a kickboxing event held on April 24, 2016 at the Yoyogi National Gymnasium in Tokyo, Japan.

Results

K-1 World GP 2016 -60kg Japan Tournament bracket

K-1 World GP 2016 -65kg World Tournament

K-1 World GP 2016 -65kg World Tournament was a kickboxing event held on June 24, 2016 at the Yoyogi National Gymnasium in Tokyo, Japan.

Results

K-1 World GP 2016 -65kg World Tournament bracket

K-1 World GP 2016 Super Featherweight World Tournament

K-1 World GP 2016 Super Featherweight World Tournament was a kickboxing event held on September 19, 2016 at the Yoyogi National Gymnasium in Tokyo, Japan.

Fight Card

K-1 World GP 2016 Super Featherweight World Tournament bracket

1 Komiyama injured, so Tebar advanced.

K-1 World GP 2016 Featherweight World Tournament

K-1 World GP 2016 Featherweight World Tournament was a kickboxing event held on November 3, 2016 at the Yoyogi National Gymnasium in Tokyo, Japan.

Fight Card

K-1 World GP 2016 Featherweight World Tournament bracket

See also
List of K-1 events
List of K-1 champions
2016 in Glory
2016 in SUPERKOMBAT
2016 in Kunlun Fight

References

External links
Official website

K-1 events
K-1
K-1